Kalinga is a kingdom described in the legendary Indian text Mahabharata. 

According to political scientist Sudama Misra, the Kalinga janapada originally comprised the area covered by the Puri and Ganjam districts.

They were a warrior clan who settled in and around the historical Kalinga region, present-day Odisha and northern parts of Andhra Pradesh.

Reference-Sudama Misra (1973). Janapada state in ancient India. Bhāratīya Vidyā Prakāśana. p. 78.

Kalinga clan warriors sided with Duryodhana in the Kurukshetra War due to matrimonial and harmony alliances between both kingdoms of Kalinga & Kuru existing even before the Great War of Mahabharata was to happen. Kalinga is the founders of five eastern kingdoms, which included: Angas (east, central Bihar), Vangas (southern West Bengal and Bangladesh), Udra (Odisha, East Madhya Pradesh and South Jharkhand), Pundras (western Bangladesh and West Bengal, India), Suhmas (north-western Bangladesh and West Bengal) shared common ancestry. Two capitals (Dantapura and Rajapura) of Kalinga were mentioned in Mahabharata. It is likely that there were many Kalinga kings, ruling different territories of Kalinga, with many migrated outside to form new kingdom.

References in Mahabharata 
Kalinga was a separate kingdom which is mentioned as an ancient Indian (Bharata Varsha) kingdom, along with the Vodhas and again along with the Kiratas residing in the east, at (6,9).

Birth of the five royal lines 
The five royal lines of Anga, Vanga, Udra, Pundra and Suhma were born from the adopted sons of king Bali. This Bali's kingdom Kalinga was either Magadha Kingdom or some kingdom close to it. There existed a kingdom to the south of Magadha as per many puranas. King Bali seems to be a king, like the famous king Mahabali, who was also known as Bali or Vali. The five royal sons were actually the sons of the sage Dīrghatamas. Dīghatamas was a sage born in the race of Gautama and Angiras. He was also known as Gautama. His eldest son also was known as Gautama.(1,104).

Though Dīrghatamas was a great sage he was blind. He was cast away by his sons and wife who threw him into river Ganges in a raft. King Bali saved him. Knowing who he was the childless king chose him to raise offspring upon the queen, according to the ordinances of those times. Thus was born the famous five kings. After their names five countries were formed. It is after their names that their dominions have come to be called Anga, Vanga, Udra, Pundra and Suhma (1,104)

Gautama's abode was in Girivraja, the capital of Magadha. With the Sudra woman Ausinari (the daughter of Usinara), Gautama begat the royal sage Kakshivat and the other five celebrated sons. These five monarchs used to visit Gautama in his abode. (2,21)

The eastern kings mentioned in the Swayamvara of Panchali 
Kalinga King attended the svayamvara of Draupadi, along with Chandrasena.

Sahadeva's conquests 
Sahadeva brought under his subjection and exacted tributes from the Paundrayas (or Pandya Kingdom) and the Dravidas along with the Udrakeralas and the Andhras and the Talavanas, the Kalingas, and the Ushtrakarnikas, and also the delightful city of Atavi and that of the Yavanas. (2,30)

Dantapura, now known as the city of Puri in Odisha, was mentioned as the capital of Kalinga in the Mahabharata (5:23). Sahadeva, the Pandava general had visited this city. Kalinga is mentioned to have another capital named Rajapura. Dantapura was conquered by Sahadeva (5,23).

Karna's conquests 
Karna conquered and brought under subjection all the kings inhabiting the Himavat, and made them pay dues. Then, descending from the mountain and rushing to the east, he reduced the Angas, and the Bangas, and the Udras, and the Mandikas, and the Magadhas. the Karkakhandas; and also included with them the Avasiras, Yodhyas, and the Ahikshatras. (3,252)

Other conquests of Kalinga 
 Vasudeva Krishna also is mentioned to have vanquished a Kalinga king, along with the Pandyas and the city of Varanasi in Kasi. (5,48), (16,6)
Bhima also is mentioned to have vanquished the Kalingas along with all the people of Kasi and Anga and Magadha (5,50)
Parashurama is mentioned to have conquered the Kalingas along with the Angas and Vangas (6,68)

Yudhishthira's entry into his new palace at Indraprastha 
Kalinga king Srutayus, attended the event of Yudhishthira entering his new palace at Indraprastha, along with Jayasena the king of Magadha.

King Bhagadatta seems to have sway over all the eastern kingdoms including Pundra, Suhma, Vanga and Kalinga. Anga kingdom was ruled by his friend Karna and Vrihadvala was the king of Kosala Kingdom, his another friend.

King Bhagadatta of Pragjyotisha accompanied by all Mlechcha tribes inhabiting the marshy regions on the sea-shore; and many mountain kings, and king Vrihadvala; and Vasudeva the king of the Paundrayas] and Kalinga came to the sacrifice. Similarly the Akastha and Kuntala and the kings of the Malavas and the Andhrakas; and the Dravidas and the Singhalas also came. (2,33). Kalinga king was mentioned as a charioteer at (2,43). Kalingas have brought tribute to the king Yudhishthira along with other kings like the Vangas, the Magadhas, the Tamraliptas, the Supundrakas, the Dauvalikas, the Sagarakas. (2,51)

Duryodhana marries from Kalinga 
Duryodhana married the daughter of Chitrangada, who was a Kalinga king, with the capital at Rajapura. This was different from the south Kalinga kingdom, with the capital at Dantapura vanquished by Sahadeva.

Once on a time many kings repaired to a self-choice at the capital of Chitrangada, the ruler of the country of the Kalingas. The city full of opulence, was known by the name of Rajapura.

Arjuna's pilgrimage 
Arjuna visited all the regions of sacred waters and other holy palaces in Kalinga during his 12-year-old pilgrimage, travelling the whole of ancient India. (1,127)

Pandavas's pilgrimage 
Pandavas, during their 12 year exile from their kingdom, set for a pilgrimage travelling the whole of ancient India, guided by sage Lomasa.

Pandavas started from the river Kausiki (now known as Kosi in Bihar) and repaired in succession to all the sacred shrines.  They came to the sea where the river Ganges falls into it; and there in the centre of five hundred rivers, performed the holy ceremony of a plunge. Then, they proceeded by the shore of the sea towards the land where the Kalinga tribes dwell. Through it passeth the river Vaitarani (now known as river Baitarani in Odisha) (3,114)

Drupada's list of kings 
Drupada, the father in law of the Pandavas and the king of Panchala, made a list of kings to be summoned to assist the Pandavas in the Kurukshetra War

In the list is mentioned Srutayus, with other Kalinga kings, Samudrasena (Vanga king) etc. (5,4).

Kalingas in Kurukshetra War 
Kalingas were mentioned as allied to Kauravas at many places like at (5-62,95). Kalinga king Srutayudha also known as Srutayus and Srutayush, was one among the generals in the Kaurava army.(6,16). The generals of Kaurava army were:-

Shakuni, a chief from Gandhara Kingdom
Shalya, the king of Madra Kingdom
Jayadratha, the king of Sindhu Kingdom
Vinda and Anuvinda, two brothers and kings of Avanti Kingdom
The Kekaya brothers from Kekeya Kingdom (opposed the Kekayas on the Pandava side)
Sudakshina the king of Kamboja Kingdom
Srutayudha the king of Kalinga Kingdom
Jayatsena a king of Magadha Kingdom
Vrihadvala the king of Kosala Kingdom
Kritavarma, a Yadava chief from Anarta Kingdom

Bhima slew Kalinga king Srutayush and other Kalinga heroes 
The battle of Kalingas is mentioned at various places (6-17,56,70,71,88,118), (7-4,7,11,20,44,72,90,118,138,152,191) (8-5,8,17,22) (9,33). The prominent among them was their battle with Pandava Bhima, which proved fatal to all the Kalinga heroes. (6-53,54), (8,70)

Then king Duryodhana urged the ruler of the Kalingas supported by a large division, for the protection of Bharadwaja’s son, Drona. Then that terrible and mighty division of the Kalingas rushed against Bhima. And then commenced a fierce battle between the Kalingas and the high-souled Bhima. (6,53).

The mighty king of the Kalingas, Srutayush, accompanied by a large army advanced towards Bhima’s car. The ruler of the Kalingas with many thousands of cars, supported by Ketumat, the son of the king of the Nishadas, with 10000 elephants and the Nishada army, surrounded Bhimasena, on all sides. Then the Chedis, the Matsyas, and Karushas, with Bhimasena at their head, with many kings impetuously rushed against the Nishadas. Terrific was the collision that took place between the few and many, between the Chedis on the one side and the Kalingas and the Nishadas on the other. The Chedis, abandoning Bhima, turned back. But  Bhima, encountering all the Kalingas, did not turn back. Bhima, staying on his car whose steeds had been slain, hurled at Sakradeva, the son of the Kalinga King Srutayush, a mace made of the hardest iron. And slain by that mace, the son of the ruler of the Kalingas, from his car, fell down on the ground, with his standard and charioteer. Later he slew Bhanumat, the prince of Kalingas, by ascending the back of his elephant and cutting his body in half, with sword. Bhima drawing his bow slew the ruler of the Kalingas, Srutayush, with seven shafts made wholly of iron. And with two shafts he slew the two protectors of the car-wheels of the Kalinga King. And he also dispatched Satyadeva and Satya. (6,54)

 A Kalinga ruler other than Srutayush, lead the Kalinga army, during the rest of the days in battle. (7-7,90)
 Two brothers Kalinga and Vrishaka were mentioned as slain in battle at (8,5)
 A Kalinga king is mentioned to be slain at (11,25)

Karna's opinion on the Kalingas 
Karna rebukes Shalya during the Kurukshetra War, and his race, and all the other tribes who had slightest similarity with Shalya's tribe.

The Karashakas, the Mahishakas, the Kalingas, the Keralas, the Karkotakas, the Virakas, and other peoples of no religion, one should always avoid. (8,44)
The Kauravas with the Panchalas, the Salwas, the Matsyas, the Naimishas, the Koshalas, the Kasapaundras, the Kalingas, the Magadhas, and the Chedis who are all highly blessed, know what the eternal religion is. (8,45)

Siva worship in Kalinga 
Siva is worshipped in the country of the Kalingas in the form of a tiger. Siva has an image in the country of the Kalingas that is called Vyaghreswara. (13,17)

Absence of Brahmins in Kalinga 
It is in consequence of the absence of Brahmanas from among them that the Sakas, the Yavanas, the Kamvojas and other Kshatriya tribes have become fallen and degraded into the status of Sudras. The Dravidas, the Kalingas, the Pulandas, the Usinaras, the Kolisarpas, the Mahishakas and other Kshatriyas, have, in consequence of the absence of Brahmanas from among their midst, become degraded into Sudras. (13,33)

Other references
A Kalinga princess named Karambha was wedded to Akrodhana a Puru king. Devatithi was their son. (1,95)
An ally of Karitkeya, generalissimo of Deva army is mentioned as Kalinga (9,45)

See also 

 Kingdoms of Ancient India

References

Further reading
Mahabharata of Krishna Dwaipayana Vyasa, translated into English by Kisari Mohan Ganguli

External links

Kingdoms in the Mahabharata
Former kingdoms